Caulocera crassicornis is a moth of the subfamily Arctiinae. It is found on Borneo, Peninsular Malaysia and Bali.

References

Lithosiini